Long Creek Bridge is a bridge that spans across Long Creek. The bridge was originally a wooden bridge that had reached the end of its useful life, and in 2009 work started on a new precast, pre-stressed concrete bridge as part of the federal government's National Action Plan.  

The new bridge includes three 12.0-metre spans, a  bridge deck and 12.0-meter precast, pre-stressed, concrete stringers.

See also
 List of bridges in Canada

References

Concrete bridges in Canada
Estevan No. 5, Saskatchewan
Road bridges in Saskatchewan